Joseph Velamin-Rutski (born as Ivan Velyaminov; , ,) - (1574 – 5 April 1637) was the "Metropolitan of Kiev, Galicia and all Ruthenia" in the Ruthenian Uniate Church — a sui juris Eastern Catholic Church in full communion with the Holy See. He reigned from 1613 to 1637. He worked to build the Greek Catholic Church in the first few decades after the Union of Brest of 1596; he also reformed the Basilian monks.

Early life
The family name of Joseph Velyaminov-Rutski (father Feliks Velyaminov from Moscow and mother Bahumila Korsak) lived in Polish–Lithuanian Commonwealth, had Ruthenian origins and was noble and Calvinist. Joseph's father Feliks Velyaminov belonged to Rurik dynasty; he escaped Moscovy while the reign of Ivan the Terrible. Ivan Velyaminov was born in 1574 and, according to a use of noble families, was named after the estate where he was born, Ruta, thus he was named Ivan Velaminov-Rutski. 
At 17 he moved in Prague where he studied under the Jesuits and converted to the Catholic Church of Latin Rite against the will of his parents. From 1593-1596, Rutski studied philosophy at Wurtzburg. After the death of his father, his mother, who remained a Calvinist, opposed Rutski's desire to enter in religious live, and stopped to support his studies. But Rustki continued his studies in the St. Athanasius Greek College in Rome, where he was authorized by Pope Clement VIII to change from the Latin Rite to the Byzantine Rite. Rutski completed his studies in 1603.

Metropolitan of Kiev
Rutski was sent to Vilnius by Pope Clement VIII in 1605. He entered the Monastery of the Holy Trinity in 1607 where he took the monastic name Jazep (Joseph). After was named archimandrite of the monastery, in 1611 he was appointed as the coadjutor bishop of Kiev. He was consecrated as bishop by Metropolitan Hypatius Pociej in June 1611.  On Paciej's death in 1613, Rutski became Metropolitan Joseph IV of Kiev. He was assisted by Josaphat Kuncevyc, with whom he worked since his time at the Monastery of the Holy Trinity. Upon becoming metropolitan, Rutski consecrated Jasaphat as coadjutor Archbishop of Polotsk with the title of Bishop of Vitebsk.

In 1617, Metropolitan Rutski united a number of monasteries into the Congregation of the Holy Trinity of the Order of Saint Basil the Great.

Following the erection of the parallel metropolis in 1620 — the Metropolis of Kiev, Galicia and all Ruthenia — he worked for unity with those bishops who remained loyal to the Ecumenical Patriarchate of Constantinople. 
 
He died on 5 February 1637 and is buried in Vilnius. His cause for beatification was begun in 1937.

Notelist

References

External links
 Yosyf Rutsky at Encyclopedia of Ukraine

1574 births
1637 deaths
People from Grodno Region
People from Nowogródek Voivodeship (1507–1795)
Ruthenian nobility of the Polish–Lithuanian Commonwealth
Polish-Lithuanian monks
17th-century Roman Catholic archbishops in the Polish–Lithuanian Commonwealth
Metropolitans of Kiev, Galicia and all Ruthenia (Holy See)
Converts to Roman Catholicism from Calvinism
Order of Saint Basil the Great
Archimandrites
Belarusian Eastern Catholics
Leaders of the Ruthenian Uniate Church
Pontifical Greek College of Saint Athanasius alumni